Krumovo is a village in Kocherinovo Municipality, Kyustendil Province, south-western Bulgaria. As of 2013 it has 63 inhabitants. It is situated close to the right bank of the Struma River to the south of the village of Buranovo, at some 2 km to the west of the municipal centre Kocherinovo.

Citations 

Villages in Kyustendil Province